The heart and club (Agrotis clavis) is a moth of the family Noctuidae. It is distributed throughout the Palearctic realm.

The common name of this species refers to the supposed shapes of the bold dark stigmata on the usually pale forewings. In this species all the stigmata have a rounded shape, contrasting with the elongated claviform stigmata of the much commoner heart and dart. The hindwings are grey, usually much darker than in heart and dart and turnip moth. The differences are not consistent however; they are highly variable in both colour and markings, and identification of atypical or worn examples may prove impossible without examination of genitalia.See Townsend et al. The wingspan is 35–40 mm. 
The main habitat is calcareous grassland.
The moth flies at night in June and July  and is attracted to light and sugar.

The larva , which is, when adult, dark brown with a pattern of black dots feeds on a variety of herbaceous plants (see list below). The young larva feeds on the leaves of the food plant, later feeding on the roots. It overwinters as a full-grown larva in a cavity in the soil before pupating in the spring.

The flight season refers to the British Isles. This may vary in other parts of the range depending on the weather.

Recorded host plants

Brassica oleracea
Chenopodium - goosefoot
Lactuca - lettuce
Polygonum - knotgrass
Rumex
Spinacia - spinach
Trifolium - clover
Zea - maize
Full list at reference.

Subspecies
 A. c. clavis - Europe
 A. c. corsa - Corsica

References

Chinery, Michael Collins Guide to the Insects of Britain and Western Europe 1986 (Reprinted 1991)
Skinner, Bernard Colour Identification Guide to the Moths of the British Isles 1984

External links

Heart and club at UKmoths
Heart and club at Markku Savela's Lepidoptera pages (Funet)
Lepiforum.de

Agrotis
Palearctic Lepidoptera
Taxa named by Johann Siegfried Hufnagel